Phlyctaenodini is a tribe of beetles in the subfamily Cerambycinae that includes the following genera and species.

 Genus Ambeodontus
 Ambeodontus tristis (Fabricius, 1775)
 Genus Ancylodonta
 Ancylodonta almeidai Mendes, 1946
 Ancylodonta apipema Martins & Galileo, 2006
 Ancylodonta glabripennis Zajciw, 1970
 Ancylodonta nitidipennis Germain, 1898
 Ancylodonta phlyctaenioides Lacordaire, 1869
 Ancylodonta tristis Blanchard in Gay, 1851
 Genus Blosyropus
 Blosyropus dentatus Fauvel, 1906
 Blosyropus spinosus Redtenbacher, 1868
 Genus Ommidion
 Ommidion mirim Martins, 1998
 Ommidion modestum Newman, 1840
 Genus Parasemnus
 Parasemnus regalis Germain, 1894

References